Kenny Bayless (born May 4, 1950) is an American boxing referee from Nevada. He is best known for having refereed many of the sport's most well-known fights.

Bayless's catchphrase, when giving his instructions to the fighters before the opening bell, is "What I say you must obey."

Kenny Bayless was raised in Berkeley, California. After graduating from college, he was recruited to teach school in Las Vegas.  He was happy for the job opportunity but excited for the chance to relocate to a city with a thriving boxing scene.

Around the same time, he became friends with Johnny Lehman, a glove man for several promoters and a boxing inspector for the Nevada Athletic Commission.  Kenny assisted Johnny in his various tasks which allowed him access to more fights and the opportunity to compare his scorecards with the professionals. Jerry Roth, a Nevada boxing judge, was a mentor he regularly sought out. Jerry asked him one day, “Why don’t you try refereeing?”  Kenny thought about it and decided, “Why not?”  He sought the help of former Nevada referee, Richard Steele, and prepared himself to enter the ring as an amateur referee in 1982.
In 1985 Kenny was hired by the Nevada Athletic Commission. He worked corners as an inspector and continued volunteering with the amateur program with the hopes of eventually becoming a professional referee. After 12 years of refereeing for Golden Gloves, and 6 years with the Commission, his opportunity finally came.

In 1991 Kenny was appointed as a professional referee. He officiated his first world title fight in 1994. 
He has been third man in the ring for thousands of bouts and over 100 title fights. Kenny was inducted into the Nevada Boxing Hall of Fame in 2014.

Career

Notable fights
2004: Antonio Tarver vs. Roy Jones Jr.
2004: Bernard Hopkins vs. Oscar De La Hoya
2006: Manny Pacquiao vs. Érik Morales II
2006: Shane Mosley vs. Fernando Vargas
2007: Oscar De La Hoya vs. Floyd Mayweather Jr.
2008: Juan Manuel Márquez vs. Manny Pacquiao II
2008: Miguel Cotto vs. Antonio Margarito
2009: Manny Pacquiao vs. Ricky Hatton
2009: Manny Pacquiao vs. Miguel Cotto
2010: Floyd Mayweather Jr. vs. Shane Mosley
2011: Manny Pacquiao vs. Shane Mosley
2012: Amir Khan vs. Danny García
2012: Manny Pacquiao vs. Juan Manuel Márquez IV
2013: Floyd Mayweather Jr. vs. Canelo Álvarez
2014: Manny Pacquiao vs. Timothy Bradley II
2014: Floyd Mayweather Jr. vs. Marcos Maidana II
2014: Andy Lee vs. Matt Korobov
2015: Floyd Mayweather Jr. vs. Manny Pacquiao
2015: Floyd Mayweather Jr. vs. Andre Berto
2016: Canelo Álvarez vs. Amir Khan
2016: Manny Pacquiao vs. Jessie Vargas
2017: Canelo Álvarez vs. Gennady Golovkin
2018: Oleksandr Usyk vs. Mairis Briedis
2018: Manny Pacquiao vs. Lucas Matthysse
2019: Manny Pacquiao vs. Keith Thurman
2019: Tyson Fury vs. Tom Schwarz
2019: Deontay Wilder vs. Luis Ortiz II
2020: Deontay Wilder vs. Tyson Fury II
2021: Josh Taylor vs. José Ramírez

References

External links

Fights

American boxing referees
Living people
1950 births
Sportspeople from Nevada